2nd Street is a station on the Hudson–Bergen Light Rail (HBLR) located west of Marshall Street near the foot of Paterson Plank Road in Hoboken, New Jersey. There are two tracks and two side platforms.

Station layout

History

The station opened on September 7, 2004. The right of way on which it is situated was originally part of the New York Central New Jersey Junction Railroad, which maintained a station there. It was later used by the Penn Central River Division and the Conrail River Line before being abandoned to make way for the current system. The station is located at the foot of the Hudson Palisades. In 2003, Jersey City agreed with a developer of a nearby factory-to-housing conversion to cover the cost of an outdoor public stairway from Jersey City Heights to the station. The stairway was never built and in June 2011 the city took responsibility for the project. The steel steps were opened in November 2013.

Station art
Station art was installed at the same time that the station opened. "A Planetary Park" features nine planets depicted in their relative scale and position to the sun. Artist John van Alstine constructed the Sun and a functioning sundial. Grace Graupe-Pillard fabricated the nine fiberglass planets with painted steel figurative attachments, as a metaphor for the celebration of the individual and his/her connection to the world.

References

External links

Subway Nut station info and photos
 2nd Street entrance from Google Maps Street View
 Platforms from Google Maps Street View (Daytime)
 Platforms from Google Maps Street View (Night)

Hudson-Bergen Light Rail stations
Railway stations in Hudson County, New Jersey
Buildings and structures in Hoboken, New Jersey
Railway stations in the United States opened in 2004
2004 establishments in New Jersey